Barbara Sims (born March 18, 1939) is an American politician who served in the Georgia House of Representatives from 2007 to 2017.

References

1939 births
Living people
Republican Party members of the Georgia House of Representatives